Frederick Peters (born Frederick P. Tuite; June 30, 1884 – April 23, 1963), was an American film actor. He appeared in 17 films between the years 1918 and 1936.

Biography 
He was born in Waltham, Massachusetts and died in Hollywood, California. His remains are interred at Forest Lawn Memorial Park in Hollywood Hills.

Selected filmography
 Tarzan and the Golden Lion (1922)
 Salomé (1923)
 The Oregon Trail (1923)
 The Millionaire Cowboy (1924)
 White Zombie (1932)
 I Conquer the Sea!  (1936)

References

External links

1884 births
1963 deaths
American male film actors
American male silent film actors
20th-century American male actors